William Daniel Musser (September 5, 1905 – March 2, 2000) was a Major League Baseball third baseman who played for the Washington Senators in 1932. He played in only one game in his entire career, collecting one hit in two at-bats.

Musser, who was born on September 5, 1905 in Zion, Pennsylvania, played his only game on September 18, 1932 at the age of 27. As a 5'9½", 160 pound athlete who threw right-handed but batted left-handed, Musser didn't get the chance to make a play in the field.

On March 2, 2000, Musser died in Upper Sandusky, Ohio at the age of 94. He was one of the oldest players to die in 2000, behind only Lou Polli (who was 99) and Clyde Sukeforth (who was 98).

References

Major League Baseball third basemen
Washington Senators (1901–1960) players
Baseball players from Pennsylvania
Penn State Nittany Lions baseball players
1905 births
2000 deaths
People from Centre County, Pennsylvania
Albany Senators players
Goldsboro Goldbugs players
Harrisburg Senators players
Richmond Colts players
York White Roses players
Youngstown Buckeyes players